In Ohio, State Route 223 may refer to:
U.S. Route 223 in Ohio, the only Ohio highway numbered 223 since about 1930
Ohio State Route 223 (1923-1927), now US 27 (Ross to McGonigle)
Ohio State Route 223 (1927-1930), Perrysburg Holland Road northwest of Holland Sylvania Road